Pushtiie is an Indian actress best known as playing the lead role of Mahi Talwar in the comedy series Mahi Way on Sony TV.

Personal life
She is the sister of actor Vrajesh Hirjee

Career
Pushtiie appeared in the second season of a famous comedy soap that ran on Zee TV known as Hum Paanch, in the late 1990s. She played the youngest daughter of Anand Mathur (played by Ashok Saraf), "Chotti" among the five daughters. This serial was produced by Ekta Kapoor. Actor Vidya Balan happened to play the second eldest of the sisters in this soap in one season.
Pushtiie played a role in Jassi Jaisi Koi Nahin, which was inspired by the Colombian telenovela Yo soy Betty, la fea. She played the character of Sanya's best friend in the soap Sanya that was aired on Hungama TV.
Her brother Vrajesh Hirjee, happens to be a famous comedian and actor in Bollywood films and shows.

Filmography

Films
 Ishq Vishk (2003)
 Sau Jhooth Ek Sach (2005)
 Koi Aap Sa (2005)
 Barsaat (2005)
 Aloo Chaat (2009)
 Aao Wish Karein (2009)
 Luv Ka The End (2011)
 Desi Boyz (2011)
 Hamari Adhuri Kahani (2015)
 Qarib Qarib Single (2017)

Web series

 Aafat (TV series) (2019) as Aditi Mahant
 Modern Love Mumbai (2022) as Alicia Martins

Short films

 Let Stalk (2015)
 The Corner Table
 It All Starts From Within (2019)

Television
 Kahaani Ghar Ghar Kii 
 Kkusum
 Kohi Apna Sa
 Sanya (TV Series)
 Miilee
 Kahiin To Hoga
 Aati Rahengi Baharein
 Meri Biwi Wonderful
 Kareena Kareena  (2004) as Pammi
 Mahi Way (2010)
 Hum Paanch season 2(2005) as Chotti Mathur 
 Jassi Jaissi Koi Nahin as Maithili (Jassi's friend)
 Pyaar Ko Ho Jaane Do as Niti Kiku Khurrana / Niti Hooda

References

Date of birth unknown
Indian television actresses
Living people
Year of birth missing (living people)